The enzyme glycosulfatase (EC 3.1.6.3) catalyzes the reaction

D-glucose 6-sulfate + H2O  D-glucose + sulfate

This enzyme belongs to the family of hydrolases, specifically those acting on sulfuric ester bonds.  The systematic name of this enzyme class is sugar-sulfate sulfohydrolase. This enzyme is also called glucosulfatase.  This enzyme participates in glycolysis and  gluconeogenesis.

References

EC 3.1.6
Enzymes of unknown structure